Major Sir Antony Guy Acland, 5th Baronet (17 August 1916 – 14 December 1983), was the eldest son of Sir Hubert Acland, 4th Baronet and Lalage Mary Kathleen Acland.

Succession
He succeeded his father as 5th Baronet Acland, of St. Mary Magdalen, Oxford on the latter's death on 6 May 1976. On his death in 1983 he was succeeded in the baronetcy by his son.

Education
He attended Winchester College.

Career
He fought in the Second World War, eventually rising to the rank of Major in the Royal Artillery.

Family
He married firstly, Avriel Ann Wingfield-Stratford, daughter of Captain Mervyn Edward John Wingfield-Stratford and Doris Amie Sheldon, on 13 September 1939, and had issue:
Gail Alison Jane Acland (b. 1942)
His first wife died in 1943.

He married secondly, Margaret Joan Rooke (d.2010), daughter of Major Nelson Rooke and Marjorie Renton, on 15 July 1944, and had issue:
Christopher Guy Dyke Acland, 6th Baronet (b. 1946)
Caroline Barbara Margaret Acland (b. 1947)

References
thePeerage.com
'ACLAND, Sir Antony Guy', Who Was Who, A & C Black, 1920–2007; online edn, Oxford University Press, Dec 2007

1916 births
1983 deaths
Antony Guy
Baronets in the Baronetage of the United Kingdom
People educated at Winchester College
British Army personnel of World War II
Royal Artillery officers